The 1964 FIBA Europe Under-18 Championship was an international basketball  competition held in Italy in 1964.

Final ranking
1. 

2. 

3. 

4. 

5. 

6. 

7. 

8.

Awards

External links
FIBA Archive

Under-18 
FIBA
1964
FIBA U18 European Championship